Louis William Staudenmaier (September 21, 1906 – October 12, 1980) was an American lawyer, businessman, and politician.

Born in Wathena, Kansas, Staudenmaier moved to Wisconsin in 1921 and went to Lourdes High School in Marinette, Wisconsin. He received his bachelor's degree from Marquette University and his law degree from  Marquette Law School in 1933. He practiced law in Marinette, Wisconsin and was involved with the Stevenson National Bank and Trust in Marinette. From 1934 to 1936, Staudenmaier served in the Wisconsin State Assembly and was a Democrat. Staudenmaier died at his home in Marinette, Wisconsin.

Notes

1906 births
1980 deaths
People from Doniphan County, Kansas
People from Marinette, Wisconsin
Marquette University alumni
Marquette University Law School alumni
Businesspeople from Wisconsin
Wisconsin lawyers
20th-century American politicians
20th-century American businesspeople
20th-century American lawyers
Democratic Party members of the Wisconsin State Assembly